is a passenger railway station in located in the town of Mihama, Minamimuro District, Mie, Japan, operated by Central Japan Railway Company (JR Tōkai).

Lines

Station layout
Atawa Station consists of one island platform connected to the station building by a level crossing. The small station building dates from the original construction of the line. The station is unattended.

Platforms

History 
Atawa Station opened on 8 August 1940, as a station on the Japanese Government Railways (JGR) Kisei-Nishi Line. The JGR became the Japan National Railways (JNR) after World War II, and the line was renamed the Kisei Main Line on 15 July 1959.  The station has been unattended since 21 December 1983. The station was absorbed into the JR Central network upon the privatization of the JNR on 1 April 1987.

Passenger statistics
In fiscal 2019, the station was used by an average of 148 passengers daily (boarding passengers only).

Surrounding area
Mihama Town Office
Hikitsukuri Shrine
Mihama Municipal Atawa Elementary School
Mihama Municipal Atawa Junior High School

See also
List of railway stations in Japan

References

External links

  JR Central timetable 

Railway stations in Japan opened in 1940
Mihama, Mie
Railway stations in Mie Prefecture